Ministry for Internal Affairs of Chuvashia (Министерство внутренних дел по Чувашской Республике) is the official name of the Chuvash police.  It is a subordinate department to the Russian Interior Ministry and the president of Chuvashia.  The local minister since 2011 is Sergei Semyonov. Its headquarters are located in Cheboksary.

Structure
 Directorate for Criminal Affairs (Управление уголовного розыска)
 Directorate for Economic Security and Combating Against Corruption (Управление экономической безопасности и противодействия коррупции)
 Center for Fighting Against Extremism and Terrorism (Центр по противодействию экстремизму)
 Operations (Оперативно-разыскная часть ;собственной безопасности)
 Traffic Police (Управление государственной инспекции безопасности дорожного движения)
 Spetsnaz (Отряд специального назначения)
 OMON (Отряд мобильный особого назначения)
 Expert-Criminal Center (Экспертно-криминалистический центр)
 Investigations (Следственное управление)
 Center for Information Technology, Communications and Information Security (Центр информационных технологий, связи и защиты информации)
 Department for Computer Crimes (Отдел К ;отдел по борьбе с правонарушениями в сфере информационных технологий)
 Cheboksary City Police (Управление Министерства внутренних дел Российской Федерации по городу Чебоксары
 Alatyr Municipal Police (Межмуниципальный отдел МВД РФ «Алатырский»)
 Batyrev Municipal Police (Межмуниципальный отдел МВД РФ «Батыревский»)
 Vurnar Municipal Police (Межмуниципальный отдел МВД РФ «Вурнарский»)
 Komsomol Municipal Police (Межмуниципальный отдел МВД РФ «Комсомольский»)
 Marinsko-Posadsky Municipal  Police (Межмуниципальный отдел МВД РФ «Мариинско-Посадский»)
 Urmar Municipal Police (Межмуниципальный отдел МВД РФ «Урмарский»)
 Tsivil Municipal Police(Межмуниципальный отдел МВД РФ «Цивильский»)
 Shumerlin Municipal  Police (Межмуниципальный отдел МВД РФ «Шумерлинский»)
 Ibersinsky Region Police Department (Отдел МВД РФ по Ибресинскому району)
 Kanash City Police Department (Отдел МВД РФ по г.Канаш)
 Kanash Region Police Department (Отдел МВД РФ по Канашскому району)
 Morgaushsk Region Police Department (Отдел МВД РФ по Моргаушскому району)
 Novo-Cheboksary City Police Department (Отдел МВД РФ по г.Новочебоксарск)
 Cheboksary Region Police Department (Отдел МВД РФ по Чебоксарскому району)
 Yadrin Region Police Department (Отдел МВД РФ по Ядринскому району)
 Dynamo Chuvash Sports Company (Чувашская республиканская организация физкультурно-спортивного общества "Динамо")

Heads of Chuvashian Police

Heads of Chuvashian Oblast Militsiya
 Timofey Volkov (1920-1921)
 Ivan Morozov (1921-1926)

People's Commissar for Internal Affairs of the Chuvash Soviet Socialist Autonomous Republic
 Alexander Lbov (1926-1927)
 Anisim Andreyev (1927-1929)
 Georgy Marcelsky (1929-1933)
 Pavel Suvorovsky (1933-1937)
 Alexey Rozanov (1937-1938)
 Pavel Konyakin (1938-1939)
 Nikolay Katkov (1939-1940)
Stepan Belolipetskiy (1940-1948)
 Nikolai Zakharov (1948-1951)

Minister for Internal Affairs of the Chuvash Soviet Socialist Autonomous Republic 
Nikolay Vakarev (1951-1954)
Georgiy Buchnev (1954-1957)

Ministers for Security of Public Order
 Vsevolod Arkhipov (1957-1965)
 Nikolay Kozin (1965-1972)

Minister for Internal Affairs 
Viktor Yefimov (1972-1979)
Vasiliy Ignatov (1979-1984)
Evgeny Salmin (1984-1987)
Yuri Nazarov (1987-1990)
Mikhail Kiselyov (1990-1995)

Minister for Internal Affairs of the Chuvash Republic 
Pyotr Dolgachev (1995-1997)
Vadim Antonov (1997-2011)
Sergey Semeyonov (since 2011)

External links
Official homepage in the Governmental Portal of the Chuvash Republic
Official Website
 ШӖМ литературӑри преми парать
 В Чувашской Республике проходит конкурс на соискание премий МВД России в области литературы и искусства, науки и техники

Politics of Chuvashia
Chuvashia
Chuvashia